Animal Bioscience is a monthly peer-reviewed open access scientific journal covering research in animal science. It was established in 1988 as the Asian-Australasian Journal of Animal Sciences, obtaining its current name in 2021. It is published by the Asian-Australasian Association of Animal Production Societies and the editors-in-chief are Jong Kyu Ha and Cheol-Heui Yun (Seoul National University).

Abstracting and indexing 
The journal is indexed and abstracted in:
AGRICOLA
Biological Abstracts
BIOSIS Previews
CAB Abstracts
Chemical Abstracts Service
Current Contents/Agricultural, Biological & Environmental Sciences
Korea Citation Index
Science Citation Index Expanded
Scopus (1996-2020)
According to the Journal Citation Reports, the journal has a 2020 impact factor of 2.509.

References

External links

Animal science journals
Publications established in 1988
Monthly journals
English-language journals